Villequiers is a commune in the Cher department in the Centre-Val de Loire region of France.

Geography
The Vauvise flows north-northeast through the eastern part of the commune.

Population

Sights
 The church of Notre-Dame, dating from the twelfth century.
 The ruins of a thirteenth-century castle.
 The sixteenth-century chateau and its park.
 The medieval watermill at the hamlet of Berry.

See also
Communes of the Cher department

References

External links

Official commune website 

Communes of Cher (department)